William Bernard Henry Foley (3 October 1906 – 13 August 1963) was a South African cricketer who played first-class cricket from 1926 to 1947.

A hard-hitting batsman and brilliant fieldsman, Foley was one of the leading batsmen in the Currie Cup in 1929–30, scoring 446 runs for Transvaal at an average of 74.33. In the final match of the tournament, when Transvaal needed a victory to win the trophy, he scored 153, enabling Transvaal to make 417 all out and take four Rhodesian wickets by stumps on the first day. Transvaal won by an innings and secured the Currie Cup. In senior cricket in Johannesburg in 1929–30 he scored three centuries in consecutive innings "as a result of great hitting", including one in which he hit 13 sixes. In 1934–35, when Transvaal again won the title, Foley scored 359 runs at 59.83.

He and his wife Gladys had five children.

References

External links

1906 births
1963 deaths
Cricketers from Cape Town
South African cricketers
Gauteng cricketers
Western Province cricketers